Michael Hutcheon is a Canadian medical doctor and author. In addition to his medical specialization in respirology, Hutcheon has published widely, predominantly with Linda Hutcheon, on the subject of the representation of medicine in cultural texts.

Select bibliography
Four Last Songs:  Aging and Creativity in Verdi, Strauss, Messiaen, and Britten (2015) (with Linda Hutcheon).
Opera: The Art of Dying. Harvard University Press, 2004 (with Linda Hutcheon).
Bodily Charm: Living Opera. Lincoln: University of Nebraska Press, 2000 (with Linda Hutcheon).
Opera: Desire, Disease, and Death. Lincoln: University of Nebraska Press, 1996 (with Linda Hutcheon)

References

External links
 Linda and Michael Hutcheon at the University of Toronto's website

Living people
Canadian pulmonologists
Year of birth missing (living people)